Something Always Happens is a 1928 American silent horror film directed by Frank Tuttle and starring Esther Ralston. The plot was the work of director Frank Tuttle, from which the screenplay was written by Florence Ryerson and Raymond Cannon, and the subtitles were provided by Herman J. Mankiewicz. The supporting cast features Neil Hamilton, Sôjin Kamiyama, Charles Sellon, Roscoe Karns, Lawrence Grant, and Mischa Auer. The picture was released on March 24, 1928, by Paramount Pictures. It is not known whether the film survives, or who holds the rights.

The Oriental character played by Sôjin Kamiyama in the film resembled Fu Manchu, not surprising as Sax Rohmer's Fu Manchu character was very popular among filmgoers in 1928. Japanese actor Sojin  played similar horror roles in The Bat (1926), The Unholy Night (1929) and Seven Footprints to Satan (1929).  This film should not be confused with the 1934 sound film of the same title.

Plot
A thrill-seeking socialite named Diana Mallory is engaged to marry a bland, very proper Englishman named Roderick Keswick. Keswick wants to purge Diana of her thrill-seeking ways, so he arranges for her to spend a night in a haunted house in order to frighten the audacity out of her. Unbeknownst to Keswick, the old mansion is being used as a hideout for an Oriental criminal mastermind named Chang-Tzo, and Diana winds up having the adventure of her life. The house sports some weird characters, one of which is referred to in the film as "The Thing" (Noble Johnson).

Cast

Esther Ralston as Diana Mallory
Neil Hamilton as Roderick Keswick
Sôjin Kamiyama as Chang-Tzo 
Charles Sellon as Perkins
Roscoe Karns as George
Lawrence Grant as The Earl of Rochester
Mischa Auer as Clark
Noble Johnson as The Thing
Vera Lewis	as Gräfin Agathe
George Y. Harvey as Scotland Yard Inspector (uncredited)

References

External links

1928 films
1920s comedy horror films
American black-and-white films
American comedy horror films
American haunted house films
American silent feature films
1920s English-language films
Films directed by Frank Tuttle
Films set in country houses
Paramount Pictures films
1928 comedy films
Films with screenplays by Florence Ryerson
1920s American films
Silent comedy-drama films
1928 horror films
Silent horror films
Silent American drama films
Silent American comedy films